Loskutov (from лоскут meaning patch) is a Russian masculine surname, its feminine counterpart is Loskutova. It may refer to
Artyom Loskutov (born 1986), Russian performance artist
Pavel Loskutov (born 1969), Estonian long-distance runner 

Russian-language surnames